Aqueduct is an American, Seattle, Washington-based indie pop band, originally hailing from Tulsa, Oklahoma, United States. Initially the band was a one-man act, created and produced by David Terry in his bedroom. Supporting members have more recently been added to the group.  Aqueduct has played with Seattle bands United State of Electronica, Modest Mouse, and Death Cab for Cutie among others.  They have received praise for their application of synthpop meter, drum, and piano, which has become more complex as the band has grown in membership.

History
Aqueduct was founded in Tulsa as the solo project of pop aficionado David Terry. Twelve hours after relocating to Seattle from Tulsa in 2003, Aqueduct was opening for Modest Mouse at The Showbox.

After months of culling and polishing new and pre-existing material with the help of producer Matt Pence, Aqueduct completed an EP, Pistols at Dawn, and the full-length album I Sold Gold. Of the debut album, Pitchfork Media said David Terry's "personal, cerebral pop [is] worth coming back to." The follow-up Or Give Me Death was released in February 2007 by Barsuk Records.

In 2015 Aqueduct returned with the album Wild Knights, coinciding with the successful funding of the Aqueduct Vinyl Project on Kickstarter.

Band members

Current
David Terry – Vocals, Piano, Synthesizer, Clavinet, Rhodes, Guitar, Bass
Matthew Nader – Guitar, Bass, Vocals, Percussion
Andy Fitts – Bass, Vocals
Matt Pence - Drums
Kimo Muraki - Pedal Steel, Coronet, Tenor & Alto Sax, Bass Clarinet, Flute

Past
Chris Whitten – drums
David Bynum – bass
Chris Barnes – bass
Jason Holstrom – guitar
Colin Carmichael – drums
Jeff Johnston – bass
James McCalister – drums
Andrew Rudd – drums, guitar, vocals
Justin Wilmore – bass
Noah Ritter – bass

Discography
Power Ballads (2003) - Barsuk Records
Pistols at Dawn (2004) - Barsuk Records
I Sold Gold (2005) - Barsuk Records
Or Give Me Death (2007) - Barsuk Records
Wild Knights (2015) - Aqueduct Music

References

External links
Aqueduct's official site
Press

Aqueduct Interview at Press Play and Record
Aqueduct at Rolling Stone
Aqueduct news, reviews, and interview at Three Imaginary Girls

Indie pop groups from Washington (state)
Indie pop groups from Oklahoma
Musical groups from Oklahoma
Barsuk Records artists